The 2005 American Le Mans Series season was the 35th season for the IMSA GT Championship, with it being the seventh under the American Le Mans Series moniker.  It was a series for Le Mans Prototypes (LMP) and Grand Touring (GT) race cars divided into 4 classes: LMP1, LMP2, GT1, and GT2.  It began March 19, 2005 and ended October 16, 2005 after 10 races.

Schedule
The schedule change from 2004 to 2005 was minimal, with only one event being added to the existing schedule.  The Grand Prix of Atlanta returned once more, once again shortly after the 12 Hours of Sebring.

Season results

Overall winner in bold.

† - The #8 B-K Motorsports entry failed to finish but completed enough laps to score points.

Teams Championship

Points are awarded to the top 10 finishers in the following order:
 20-16-13-10-8-6-4-3-2-1
Exceptions were for the 4 Hour Monterey Sports Car Championships was scored in the following order:
 23-19-16-13-11-9-7-6-5-4
And for the 12 Hours of Sebring and Petit Le Mans which award the top 10 finishers in the following order:
 26-22-19-16-14-12-10-9-8-7

Cars failing to complete 70% of the winner's distance are not awarded points.  Teams only score the points of their highest finishing entry in each race.

LMP1 Standings

LMP2 Standings

GT1 Standings

 Note - Although Maserati Corse was allowed to race the non-homologated Maserati MC12, it was not allowed to score championship points.

GT2 Standings

External links
 American Le Mans Series homepage
 IMSA Archived ALMS Results and Points

American Le Mans Series
American Le Mans Series
American Le Mans Series seasons